A silent piano is an acoustic piano where there is an option to silence the strings by stopping the hammers from striking them. A silent piano is designed for private silent practice. In the silent mode, sensors pick up the piano key movement, converting it to a MIDI signal that can be sent to an electronic sound module, allowing the person playing to use headphones. The pianos also have full MIDI capability for sending signals and can be linked to a computer for use with notation software, etc.

Mechanics
In all silent systems, engaging the silent function causes a bar to move into place such that it intercepts the hammer shank and stops the hammer from hitting the piano string. Older models detected key movement by using mechanical sensors that affected the touch and produced a clicking sound, whereas newer models use optical sensors that do not affect the feel or sound of the piano.

In more advanced systems, usually on grand pianos, the piano's action is also altered when the silent function is engaged. This changes the action's setoff setting so that the escapement trips at a lower point in the hammer's motion towards the string. This allows the action to be regulated correctly in the non-silent setting. Without it, the action must be regulated to be a compromise between what is needed in non-silent mode and what is needed in silent mode.

Manufacturers
Silent pianos are available from many manufacturers, including Steinway, Bechstein, Bösendorfer, Grotrian-Steinweg, Kawai, Yamaha, Schimmel, Petrof and Seiler. PianoDisc provides systems to be installed ex post.

References

Piano